Dangtu County is one of three counties under the jurisdiction of the prefecture-level city of Ma'anshan in the southeast of Anhui Province, China.

Dangtu is one of the longest established counties in eastern China and formed part of the Taiping Prefecture during the Ming and Qing Dynasties.

In September 2012, 3 towns of Bowang, Danyang, and Xinshi from Dangtu County were split to form Bowang District.

Geography

The county is situated immediately south of the Ma'anshan urban core, and its northern built-up region is effectively a suburb of the greater Ma'anshan area. It is situated on the eastern (right) bank of the Yangtze River and western shore of Shijiu Lake; it borders Jiangsu Province to the east and the prefecture-level city of Wuhu to the southwest. Its southern half is still largely rural.

Climate

Administrative divisions
Dangtu County is divided to 9 towns and 2 townships.
9 Towns

2 Townships
 Jiangxin Township
 Dalong Township

Demographics
The main urban center of Dangtu County is home to approximately  residents.

Culture
Dangtu County has a long history of more than 2000 years as a county. It was called Danyang in the Qin Dynasty but during the Sui Dynasty, the county became known as "Dangtu". A famous poet named Xie Tiao once praised Dangtu County as the place of beautiful mountains and rivers. Li Bai had come to Dangtu seven times and his uncle was the former governor of Dangtu County. There is a memorial to the famous Chinese poet, Li Bai (aka Li Po c.700-762), who is said to have drowned at Dangtu after attempting to embrace the reflection of the moon. Dangtu people have a sense of familiarity with many of the poems Li Bai wrote because the beautiful scenery he described in his poems are the actual places where the local people have lived all of their lives.

Economy
Dangtu County, which borders the municipality of Nanjing in Jiangsu, is a relatively prosperous county, with a 2015 GDP per capita of approximately $6,000 (US). Its factories produce bricks, candles, electric lamps, and soap. Its major exports are frozen meat, textiles, leather and plastic products. Industry occupies about 60% of the Dangtu economy, with services generating 20% of economic output.

References

External links

County-level divisions of Anhui
Ma'anshan